Yvette Healy is an American, former collegiate All-American softball second basemen and current head coach at Wisconsin, originally from Orland Park, Illinois. She played college softball at DePaul from 1996 to 1999 and was a four-time Summit League honoree.

Playing career
Healy played college softball for the DePaul Blue Demons in the Summit League from 1996 to 1999.

Coaching career

Wisconsin
In the summer of 2010, Yvette Healy was announced as the head coach of the Wisconsin softball program.

Personal life
Healy is married to her husband Shawn. They have two daughters named Grace and Maeve.

Statistics

Head coaching record

College

References

Living people
Softball players from Illinois
Female sports coaches
American softball coaches
Year of birth missing (living people)
DePaul Blue Demons softball players
DePaul Blue Demons softball coaches
Loyola Ramblers softball coaches
Wisconsin Badgers softball coaches